Alexandros Avranas (born 1977) is a Greek film director best known for such films as Miss Violence and Dark Crimes starring Jim Carrey.

At the 2013 Venice Film Festival Avranas won the Silver Lion for Best Director for Miss Violence.

References

External links

Greek film directors
Greek screenwriters
Greek film producers
Living people
Venice Best Director Silver Lion winners
1977 births
People from Larissa